Broomhaugh and Riding is a civil parish in Northumberland, England. It includes the villages of Broomhaugh and Riding Mill.  According to the 2001 census it had a population of 936, increasing to 966 at the 2011 census.

History 
The parish was formed on 1 April 1955 from "Broomhaugh" and "Riding" parishes.

Governance 
Broomhaugh and Riding is in the parliamentary constituency of Hexham.

References

Civil parishes in Northumberland